Adetus columbianus is a species of beetle in the family Cerambycidae. It was described by Breuning in 1948.

References

Adetus
Beetles described in 1948